The Sase prospect is a copper-bearing deposit in Katanga Province, Democratic Republic of the Congo, being developed by Tiger Resources.

The Sase prospect lies within the Lupoto concession, about  the south of Tiger's Kipoi Mine and to the north of the older Lupoto Mine in the Kalumines concession area.
In 2008 Tiger reported that exploratory drilling had found ores with significant grades of copper.
Maiden resource was planned for release in the first half of 2011.
In February 2011, Tiger said it was planning to build a solvent-extraction plant that would process copper ore feed from the Kipoi and Lupoto projects.

References

Copper mines in the Democratic Republic of the Congo
Mining in Haut-Katanga Province